Mount Pleasant Municipal Airport may refer to:
				
Mount Pleasant Municipal Airport (Iowa) in Mount Pleasant, Iowa, United States (FAA: MPZ)
Mount Pleasant Municipal Airport (Michigan) in Mount Pleasant, Michigan, United States (FAA: MOP)

See also
Mount Pleasant Airport (disambiguation)
Mount Pleasant Regional Airport (disambiguation)